Middletown Area Transit, popularly known as MAT, was the provider of public transportation serving Middletown, Connecticut, as well as portions of Cromwell, Durham, East Hampton and Portland. The area routes connect with CTtransit Hartford's 55 route and 9 Town Transit's Route 644 & 645 at the MAT Terminal, including the 590 (M-Link) service connecting with the Meriden Transit District, Amtrak and the Hartford Line at the Meriden railroad station, with CTtransit New Britain's 512  route at Walmart in Cromwell and its 501 route at the Westfield Meriden shopping mall.

Middletown Area Transit merged with the Estuary Transit District on July 1, 2022.

See also
Connecticut Transit
Northeast Transportation Company

References

External links

Bus transportation in Connecticut
Transportation in Middlesex County, Connecticut
Transit agencies in Connecticut